KTDR (96.3 FM) is a radio station broadcasting a hot adult contemporary format. Licensed to Del Rio, Texas, United States, the station is currently owned by RCommunications Group.

References

External links

TDR
1986 establishments in Texas
Radio stations established in 1986